Ben Leatigaga (born 25 January 1988) is an American rugby seven center who won a bronze medal at the 2015 Pan American Games. He graduated from the Walsingham Academy and previously served as first lieutenant with the United States Army. He previously played basketball as a point guard.

References

1988 births
Living people
Rugby sevens players at the 2015 Pan American Games
Male rugby sevens players
American rugby union players
Pan American Games medalists in rugby sevens
Pan American Games bronze medalists for the United States
Medalists at the 2015 Pan American Games